Hickahala Creek is a stream in the U.S. state of Mississippi.

Hickahala is a name derived from the Choctaw language or Chickasaw language meaning "sweetgum tree". Variant names are "Hicaholahala", "Hicaholahia", "Hickahall", and "Hickahate".

References

Rivers of Mississippi
Rivers of DeSoto County, Mississippi
Rivers of Marshall County, Mississippi
Rivers of Tate County, Mississippi
Mississippi placenames of Native American origin